Green Giant and Le Sueur (spelled Le Sieur in Canada) are brands of frozen and canned vegetables owned by B&G Foods. The company's mascot is the Jolly Green Giant.

Company and brand history 

The Minnesota Valley Canning Company was founded in 1903 in Le Sueur, Minnesota. It used the brand name "Le Sueur Z" for canned vegetables starting in 1903; "Le Sueur" by itself was first used in 1933.

The brand "Green Giant Great Big Tender Peas" was first used in 1925, and the figure of a giant was introduced three years later by Carly Stanek (Bingum). The brand was created in response to the discovery of a new variety of pea, the Prince of Wales; they were "oblong, wrinkled, and, as peas go, huge. Despite their size, they were tender, and had a special flavor and sweetness that couldn't be matched. The company went to the brands for which it canned and found that none of them wanted to sell the new peas. So Minnesota Valley decided to sell them under its own label. Rather than apologize for the size of the peas, they decided to emphasize it. They named the peas 'Green Giant.'" The original mascot had very little in common with the familiar green figure of today: he was a scowling caveman wearing a bearskin rather than foliage designed by John Olson from northwestern Minnesota (this original concept actually owed much to a dark Brothers Grimm fairy tale, Der Bärenhäuter – Bearskin). 

In 1935 a young copywriter, Leo Burnett, revised the face of the brand: "he traded the bearskin for a leafy suit, gave the Giant a smile...and put the word 'Jolly' in front of the Giant's name." The Giant made his first television appearances in 1954, and was later voiced by Elmer Dresslar, Jr.  The booming "Ho, ho, ho" became the Giant's signature tagline in 1961. Since 1972 he has had a young apprentice, the Little Green Sprout, who represents the consumer.

The company was renamed to the Green Giant Company in 1950. In 1979 it merged with the Pillsbury Company; in 2001, the group was acquired by General Mills. In 2015, General Mills sold the brand to B&G Foods for $765 million in cash.

In Canada the brand Le Sieur  has been used since at least 1964, instead of Le Sueur – presumably to avoid the implications of the French word sueur (= 'sweat').

In 1963 a  33 rpm EP, "When Pea-Pickers Get Together", featuring Tennessee Ernie Ford and the Green Valley Singers was released. Side one was a medley of popular folk songs, while side two told the story of how Ford and the Jolly Green Giant collaborated on writing his signature TV song ("How The Green Giant Found His Song (And Almost Lost His Ho! Ho! Ho!)"). The jacket for the record gives the official "biography" of the Jolly Green Giant.

In 1964 The Kingsmen scored a hit at #4 on the Billboard Hot 100 with "The Jolly Green Giant", a novelty tune about the Giant's love life.

In 1999 the marketing industry's leading publication, Advertising Age, posted a list of the twentieth century's top ten advertising icons, and placed the Green Giant third (behind the Marlboro Man and Ronald McDonald, and ahead of Betty Crocker, the Energizer Bunny, the Pillsbury Doughboy, Aunt Jemima, the Michelin Man, Tony the Tiger, and Elsie [the Borden cow]).

In 2005, the Jolly Green Giant was shown in MasterCard's "Icons" commercial during Super Bowl XXXIX, which depicts advertising mascots having dinner together.

The Valley 

"The Valley of the Jolly Green Giant" refers to the Minnesota River valley around Le Sueur. Today, just before dropping down into the valley heading south on U.S. Route 169 an enormous wooden sign of the Jolly Green Giant, along with the Little Green Sprout, is visible with the caption "Welcome to the Valley."

 further south on US 169, in the city of Blue Earth, Minnesota, stands a  fiberglass statue of the Jolly Green Giant. The statue attracts over 10,000 visitors a year.

The statue was the idea of Paul Hedberg, the founding owner of local radio station KBEW. During weekdays in the summertime Hedberg would interview people passing through Blue Earth on U.S. Highway 169 for his popular radio program Welcome Travellers. At the end of each interview, Hedberg presented guests with a sample of the peas and corn which had been produced by the town's Green Giant canning plant, along with a sample of what passed for the blue riverbed clay that gave the town its name. A common theme arising in these interviews was a desire to "see the Green Giant."

In the late 1970s the nation's first transcontinental freeway, Interstate 90, was nearing completion; the final stretch of road to be opened was that portion surrounding Blue Earth. Hedberg was one of many civic leaders instrumental in rerouting the freeway closer to Blue Earth, and saw this as an opportunity to attract new visitors to the town. Keeping in mind how the prospect of seeing the Green Giant fired the imaginations of the children who passed through Blue Earth with their parents each summer, in 1977 Hedberg contacted Thomas H. Wyman, President of Green Giant, to see if the company would allow a statue of their corporate symbol to be erected in Blue Earth to draw the attention of the steady stream of travelers who would be utilizing the new interstate. In his autobiography, The Time of My Life, Hedberg recounts how Wyman was receptive to the idea – on the condition that funds for the project were raised locally, and that the company had to give approval to the final design. After this meeting Hedberg approached several local businesses and asked each to contribute $5,000; within a week the full $50,000 had been secured.

The four-ton statue was crafted by Creative Display from Sparta, Wisconsin. Work began on the statue in the spring of 1978, with a target for completion to coincide with the opening of Blue Earth's section of Interstate 90 on September 23, 1978. The statue was not delivered fully assembled – the pose Wyman approved had the Giant standing with hands on his hips, but he was then too wide to fit on a flatbed truck so his two arms were transported separately to be attached upon arrival in Blue Earth. As Hedberg remembers in his autobiography, "I made arrangements with a local crane owner to display the statue temporarily at the site of the I-90 dedication: suspended from this crane, with straps under his armpits, the Giant offered his approving smile for what we’d accomplished with the Highway Administration! It was a spectacular piece of publicity for Blue Earth."

The statue is mounted on a pedestal and has steps so visitors may take a picture standing directly under it. The imposing Green Giant is typically included in lists of America's unusual or notable roadside attractions,  and has been featured in numerous magazines, including Time, Budget Travel, and Mental Floss. Blue Earth is at the end of the Minnesota River Valley and still has a canning plant formerly owned by Green Giant that continues to can peas and corn each summer.

Blue Earth's major summer festival is Giant Days, held annually on the weekend following the Fourth of July. In 2014, in honor of the 35th anniversary of the Green Giant statue's installation on its base, Paul Hedberg was asked to serve as Grand Marshal of the parade that culminates the festivities. Every year during Giant Days, green footsteps are painted on sidewalks throughout downtown Blue Earth, leading to local businesses.

See also 
 Birds Eye
 List of tallest statues
 List of the tallest statues in the United States
 Green Man

Notes

References

Further reading

External links 
 
 History of the Jolly Green Giant Mascot at Advertising Age magazine
 Green Giant Company in MNopedia, the Minnesota Encyclopedia
 Collection of mid-twentieth century advertising featuring Green Giant products from The TJS Labs Gallery of Graphic Design.

Companies based in Minnesota
General Mills brands
Food manufacturers of the United States
Food and drink companies established in 1903
Fruit and vegetable characters
General Mills characters
Corporate mascots
Food advertising characters
Fictional giants
Male characters in advertising
Fictional characters from Minnesota
Advertising campaigns
Frozen food brands
1903 establishments in Minnesota
2015 mergers and acquisitions